The American Society of Church History (ASCH) was founded in 1888 with the disciplines of Christian denominational and ecclesiastical history as its focus. Today the society's interests include the broad range of the critical scholarly perspectives, as applied to the history of Christianity and its relationship to surrounding cultures in all periods, locations, and contexts. The society was founded by Philip Schaff.

The ASCH records are housed at the Presbyterian Historical Society in Philadelphia, Pennsylvania.

ASCH publishes the quarterly academic journal Church History: Studies in Christianity and Culture, which was established in 1932.

Presidents 

 1888: Philip Schaff
 1932: William Warren Sweet
 1933: Conrad Henry Moehlman
 1934: Frederick William Loetscher
 1935: John T. McNeill
 1936: Wilhelm Pauck
 1937: Herbert Schneider
 1938: Reuben E. E. Harkness
 1939: Charles Lyttle
 1940: Roland Bainton
 1941: F. W. Buckler
 1942: E. R. Hardy Jr.
 1943: Harold S. Bender
 1944: Percy V. Norwood
 1945: Kenneth Scott Latourette
 1946: Matthew Spinka
 1947: Ernest G. Schwiebert
 1949: Massey H. Shepherd
 1950: James Hastings Nichols
 1951: Ray C. Petry
 1953: Sidney Mead
 1954: Carl E. Schneider
 1955: L. J. Trinterud
 1956: Quirinus Breen
 1957: H. Shelton Smith
 1958: George Huntston Williams
 1959: Robert T. Handy
 1960: Jerald C. Brauer
 1961: Harold J. Grimm
 1962: Lefferts A. Loetscher
 1963: Raymond W. Albright
 1964: Albert C. Outler
 1965: Jaroslav Pelikan
 1967: Richard Cameron
 1969: John Tracy Ellis
 1970: Robert M. Grant
 1971: Martin E. Marty
 1972: Carl Bangs
 1973: William A. Clebsch
 1974: Clyde L. Manschreck
 1975: Sydney E. Ahlstrom
 1976: John F. Wilson
 1977: Lewis W. Spitz
 1978: Edwin S. Gaustad
 1979: Brian A. Gerrish
 1980: Robert M. Kingdon
 1981: William R. Hutchison
 1982: C. C. Goen
 1983: Jane Dempsey Douglass
 1984: Henry W. Bowden
 1985: David C. Steinmetz
 1986: Winton U. Solberg
 1987: Jay P. Dolan
 1988: William J. Courtenay
 1989: Elizabeth A. Clark
 1990: Timothy L. Smith
 1991: Richard L. Greaves
 1992: George Marsden
 1993–1994: Nathan O. Hatch
 1994–1995: Stephen J. Stein
 1995–1996: Bernard McGinn
 1996–1997: Barbara Brown Zikmund
 1997–1998: Richard Kieckhefer
 1998–1999: Peter W. Williams
 1999–2000: Ronald L. Numbers
 2000–2001: Hans J. Hillerbrand
 2001–2002: Amanda Porterfield
 2002–2003: E. Brooks Holifield
 2003–2004: Dale A. Johnson
 2004–2005: Dennis Dickerson
 2005–2006: Mark Noll
 2006–2007: Jan Shipps
 2007–2008: John Van Engen
 2008–2009: Grant Wacker
 2009–2010: Charles H. Lippy
 2010–2011: Richard P. Heitzenrater
 2011–2012: Barbara Newman
 2012–2013: Laurie F. Maffly-Kipp
 2013–2014: Bruce Hindmarsh
 2014–2015: Thomas F.X. Noble
 2015–2016: Margaret Bendroth
 2016–2017: Ronald Rittgers
 2017–2018: Candy Gunther Brown
 2018–2019: Ralph Keen
 2019: Paul C.H. Lim
 2020–present: Daniel Ramírez

References

Further reading

External links
 

1888 establishments in New York (state)
Historical societies of the United States
Historiography of Christianity
Member organizations of the American Council of Learned Societies
Non-profit organizations based in Connecticut
Organizations established in 1888
Yale Divinity School